Michael Andrew Brooks-Jimenez (born 1969/70) is an American lawyer and Democratic member of the Oklahoma Senate. He was elected in a 2017 special election to fill the vacancy caused by the resignation of Ralph Shortey. He represents the 44th district, which covers parts of southern Oklahoma City.

Biography
Brooks-Jimenez was born in Oklahoma City to a white father, Bud Brooks, and a Mexican-American mother, Patricia Jimenez Brooks. Both were educators. He graduated from Mount St. Mary High School, and with a bachelor's degree from Oklahoma State University and a Juris Doctor from the University of Oklahoma College of Law. Brooks-Jimenez established a law firm, specializing in immigration law and Criminal Defense.

Political career
Brooks-Jimenez ran for the state Senate in 2014, losing to incumbent Republican Ralph Shortey. After Shortey resigned in March 2017 after being charged with child prostitution, Brooks-Jimenez declared his candidacy for the open seat. He defeated Republican Joe Griffin in the special election, held on July 11, 2017.

Brooks-Jimenez was the first proudly Latino member of the Senate, and is one of five in the Legislature. No candidates filed to run against Brooks-Jimenez in 2018 or 2022 primaries or general elections. He currently serves as Assistant Minority Leader. Brooks-Jimenez is also member of The National Association of Latino Elected Officials, The Board of Latino Legislative Leaders and was selected in 2021 to be part of The New Deal Leaders. In 2020 Senator Brooks founded the Oklahoma Latino Legislative Caucus.

Personal life
Brooks-Jimenez and his wife, Jessica Martinez-Brooks, have 2 children; Joaquin and Lucy. He is a Catholic and attends St. James Catholic Church.

Political positions
Brooks-Jimenez believes illegal immigration is an issue best handled at the federal level, and supports rights of immigrants, both legal and illegal, residing in the United States. He prioritized education, the economy, and infrastructure in his 2014 campaign for the Senate.

Electoral history

References

External links
 Campaign website
 Senate website

20th-century births
Living people
American people of Mexican descent
American politicians of Mexican descent
Immigration lawyers
Oklahoma lawyers
Democratic Party Oklahoma state senators
Oklahoma State University alumni
Politicians from Oklahoma City
University of Oklahoma College of Law alumni
21st-century American politicians
Catholics from Oklahoma
Year of birth missing (living people)
Hispanic and Latino American state legislators in Oklahoma